Addis Run is a tributary stream of the Hughes River in the U.S. state of West Virginia.

Addis Run has the name of a local landowner.  This is the only stream of this name in the United States.

Course
Addis Run rises about 2 miles southwest of Harrisville, West Virginia, in Ritchie County and then flows generally west to join North Fork Hughes River about 1 mile northeast of Riverside.

Watershed
Addis Run drains  of area, receives about 44.8 in/year of precipitation, has a wetness index of 258.50, and is about 89% forested.

See also
List of rivers of West Virginia

References

Rivers of Ritchie County, West Virginia
Rivers of West Virginia